Kosmos 149 ( meaning Cosmos 149), also known as DS-MO No.1 was a technology demonstration satellite which was launched by the Soviet Union in 1967 as part of the Dnepropetrovsk Sputnik programme. Its primary mission was to demonstrate orientation control by means of an aerodynamic skirt stabiliser.

It was launched aboard a Kosmos-2I 63SM rocket from Site 86/1 at Kapustin Yar. The launch occurred at 10:07 GMT on 21 March 1967.

It decayed from orbit on 7 April 1967. Kosmos 149 was the first of two DS-MO satellites to be launched. It was succeeded by Kosmos 320, which was launched in January 1970.

See also

 1967 in spaceflight

References

Spacecraft launched in 1967
Kosmos 0149
1967 in the Soviet Union
Dnepropetrovsk Sputnik program